Ustad Shamsuddin "Bhurji" Khan (1890–1950) was a Hindustani Classical vocalist of the Jaipur-Atrauli Gharana founded by his father, Ustad Alladiya Khan.

Early life
Ustad Bhurji Khan was the third and the youngest son of Ustad Alladiya Khan. Despite this, Ustad Alladiya Khan felt that Ustad Bhurji Khan was the most capable of his children.

Health
In his late youth, Ustad Bhurji Khan fell seriously ill with influenza while visiting Uniara, Rajasthan.

Musical style and training
Ustad Bhurji Khan's illness affected his musical growth. Brain-damage from the illness contributed to his forgetfulness and memory loss. As a result, his father abandoned training him, where he continued his musical training with his uncle, Ustad Haider Khan. Despite Ustad Haider Khan's persistence, it was only until Ustad Bhurji Khan took to teaching that his memory solidified and his musical growth resumed. After this, his training with his father also resumed.

Students
Ustad Bhurji Khan was instrumental in expanding the presence of the Jaipur-Atrauli gayaki in Hindustani Classical music. Among his many disciples are Gaanyogini Dhondutai Kulkarni, Madhusudhan Kanetkar, Gajananbua Joshi, Madhukar Sadolikar, Wamanrao Sadolikar,  and his own son, Baba Azizuddin Khan, who himself was tutored by none other than his legendary grandfather, Ut. Alladiya Khan .

Ustad Bhurji Khan's famous disciple was Pandit Mallikarjun Mansur. After the death of his elder brother, Ustad Manji Khan, Ustad Bhurji Khan agreed to teach Pandit  Mallikarjun Mansur under his father's command.

Death
Ustad Bhurji Khan died in 1950 after a prolonged illness.

References

1890 births
1950 deaths
Hindustani singers
People from Bundi district
20th-century Indian male classical singers
Indian music educators
Vocal gharanas
Jaipur gharana
Singers from Rajasthan
20th-century Khyal singers